The Return of José do Telhado (Portuguese: A Volta de José do Telhado) is a 1949 Portuguese historical drama film directed by Armando de Miranda and starring Virgilio Teixeira as José do Telhado, a nineteenth century Portuguese bandit. Teixeira had previously played him in the 1945 film José do Telhado, which had also been directed by de Miranda.

Partial cast
 Virgilio Teixeira as José do Telhado
 Eduardo Colombo 
 Juvenal de Araújo 
 Milú

References

Bibliography
 João Fatela. O sangue e a rua: elementos para uma antropologia da violência em Portugal (1926-1946). Publicações Dom Quixote, 1989.

External links 

1949 films
1940s historical drama films
Portuguese historical drama films
1940s Portuguese-language films
Films directed by Armando de Miranda
Films set in the 19th century
Portuguese sequel films
Portuguese black-and-white films
1949 drama films